Suspension of Disbelief is the lone release by American supergroup AP2, put out by Tooth & Nail Records in 2000.  AP2 was a "sequel" to the band Argyle Park, who released their only album Misguided in 1995. Argyle Park had consisted of Buka and Klayton, while AP2 featured primary players Buka and Level, with Klayton producing the record. In the winter of 2000, Tooth & Nail cut AP2 due to the low sales of this album. Since Buka had only wanted AP2 to release albums for Tooth & Nail, AP2 ended as a band after Tooth & Nail dropped them.

Suspension of Disbelief is as every bit as experimental as its precursor, including elements of gabber techno, dance-pop, drum and bass, ambient techno, R&B, punk rock, and metal. The opening track, "The End", contains vocal samples from two of the old Argyle Park songs, giving the album some sense of closure to that era of the band before diving headlong into the new material.

Track listing
"The End" (Level, Buka) – 4:40
 samples: "Leave Me Alone" and "A Burden's Folly" by Argyle Park
"Heroin Hate" (Level, Buka) – 5:32
"My Sympathies" (Klayton, Mark Salomon, Buka, Level) – 5:26
 guest vocals: Mark Salomon, Klayton
"A Thousand Terrible Things" (Level, Buka) – 2:26
"Silhouette of Rage" (Level, Buka) – 3:58
 guest vocals: Daren "Klank" Diolosa
"A New Wound" (Level)  – 5:54
"The Red Shirt Conspiracy" (Level, Buka, Joel Timothy Bell) – 2:36
 guest vocals: Joel Timothy Bell
"The Pact" (Level, Buka) – 5:05
 vocals: Sage
"Resurrection of the Ravens" (Klayton, Level) – 4:14
 guest vocals: Klayton
"Goodbye" (Level) – 4:46
"The Only Man I Know" (Level) – 4:22
 drums: J.M. Zaletel
"Cold Breath of Sorrow" (Level, Buka) – 1:32

Guest appearances
 Klayton – producer of album and writer of songs "My Sympathies" and "Resurrection of the Ravens"
 Daren "Klank" Diolosa of Klank, Circle of Dust, and Left Out
 Mark Salomon of Stavesacre and The Crucified
 Joel Timothy Bell of Ghoti Hook
 Sage
 J.M. Zaletel of Klank

References

Argyle Park albums
2000 albums
Tooth & Nail Records albums